Cyrus Dehmie is an Australian professional footballer who plays as a forward for Næstved Boldklub. 

Dehmie started his professional career with Brisbane Roar and scored his first goal(s) for the Brisbane Roar on the 24th of October 2021 in which he scored a hat-trick in a round-of-16 FFA Cup match against Queensland Lions FC.

Early life
Cyrus Dehmie attended Anglican Church Grammar School and was a member of the First XI who won the 2019 GPS Football Premiership, the school's first win since the competition began in 1991.

References

External links

Living people
Australian soccer players
Association football forwards
Brisbane Roar FC players
A-League Men players
National Premier Leagues players
2002 births